Sophonisba is a 1730 tragedy by the British writer James Thomson. It is based on the story of the Carthaginian noblewoman Sophonisba who committed suicide rather than be paraded in a Roman triumph at the end of the Second Punic War. The story has been made into a number of plays including Nathaniel Lee's restoration tragedy Sophonisba and Voltaire's later Sophonisbe.

The original Drury Lane cast included Robert Wilks as Masinissa, John Mills as Syphax, Charles Williams as Scipio, John Roberts as Narva, Roger Bridgewater as Laelius and Anne Oldfield as Sophonisba.

References

Bibliography
 Baines, Paul & Ferarro, Julian & Rogers, Pat. The Wiley-Blackwell Encyclopedia of Eighteenth-Century Writers and Writing, 1660-1789. Wiley-Blackwell, 2011.
 Burling, William J. A Checklist of New Plays and Entertainments on the London Stage, 1700-1737. Fairleigh Dickinson Univ Press, 1992.
 Gerrard, Christine. Aaron Hill: The Muses' Projector, 1685-1750. Oxford University Press, 2003.

1730 plays
British plays
West End plays
Tragedy plays
Phoenicia in fiction
Cultural depictions of Sophonisba